The Macatawa Area Express is the primary provider of mass transportation in Ottawa County's Holland-Zeeland metropolitan area. The system is named after the Macatawa River, which runs through Holland, Michigan.

History 
It was originally established in the year 2000 as an outgrowth of Holland's dial-a-ride bus service. Until July 1, 2007, the system was under Holland city government's direct jurisdiction. Since then, Macawata Area Express has been governed by an independent Transportation Authority board made up of representatives from the City of Holland and Holland Charter Township. The Local Advisory Council, which is made up of students, residents, and persons with disabilities who ride the system, serves as a bridge between the Transportation Authority and MAX riders, evaluating system operations, discussing rider issues and offering solutions.

Bus service 
The MAX system is made up of eight fixed routes and a dial-a-ride service. Except for Routes 8 and 11, all of the system routes operate within Holland city limits. Louis & Helen Padnos Transportation Center serves as the system hub. Every route converges there at the end of every hour, making it easy for riders to transfer to any route they want. During weekday mornings, riders can also transfer to southwest-bound Pere Marquette train, which links riders to Bangor, St Joseph-Benton Harbor and Chicago.

Hours of operation 
MAX operates between 6:00 AM – 7:00 PM on weekdays and 8:00 AM – 7:00 PM on Saturdays. As of October 2013, MAX introduced a special Twilight Route, which provides evening service through central Holland Monday-Saturday, between 7:00 PM - 10:00 PM. Fares are $1.00 for adults and $0.50 for children between 5–17 years old. Children younger than five and senior citizens ride for free. MAX also offers a wide variety of passes  MAX recorded 316,578 individual trips for 2009, and ridership continues to slowly climb as of March 2010.

Route list
1 North Mall Area
2 Butternut/136th St
3 Southshore Area
4 Waverly/120th St
5 Washington/South River
6 Holland Heights
7 Lincoln/South Town
8 Zeeland
9 Twilight Route
10 Twilight North
11 James/E. Riley

External links

Bus transportation in Michigan
Transportation in Ottawa County, Michigan